Borija may refer to:

 Borija, Kalinovik, populated place in Bosnia and Herzegovina
 Borija (musical instrument), an early Bosnian type of trumpet

See also 
 Boria (disambiguation)